"Torn On The Platform" is the third single from Jack Peñate. It was released on 18 June 2007. It reached #7 in the UK singles chart, staying in the top 10 for one week. The music video for "Torn on the Platform" shows a paper puppet show with Peñate's head on the puppet. The guitarwork on the track has been cited for its similarities to the guitar on The Housemartins track "Happy Hour".

External links
 

2007 singles
XL Recordings singles
2007 songs
Song recordings produced by Tony Hoffer